Amos Bullocks (February 7, 1939) was a former American football running back in the National Football League (NFL) for the Dallas Cowboys and Pittsburgh Steelers. He played college football at Southern Illinois University.

Early years
Bullocks attended Chicago's Dunbar High School, before moving on to Southern Illinois University. He finished ranked first in school history in career rushing yards (2,441) and career touchdowns (32). He was twice named honorable-mention Little All-American. 

In 1981, he was inducted into the Southern Illinois Athletics Hall of Fame.

Professional career

Dallas Cowboys
Bullocks was selected by the Dallas Cowboys in the twentieth round (270th overall) of the 1962 NFL Draft and by the Buffalo Bills in the tenth round (76th overall) of the 1962 AFL Draft.

On December 9, 1961, he signed with the Cowboys. As a rookie he was the backup to Don Perkins and played predominantly on special teams. He had a franchise record 72-yard touchdown run against the Chicago Bears and also returned a kickoff for 62 yards against the New York Giants.

In 1963, he registered 341 (third on the team), 2 touchdowns and 453 kickoff return yards (23.8-yard average). In 1964, he contracted hepatitis and was placed on the injured reserve list.

The Cowboys selected offensive tackle Bill Frank in the 18th round of the 1963 NFL Draft, but because he was still under contract in the Canadian Football League, the Cowboys had to additionally trade running back Bullocks to the BC Lions in exchange for Frank's playing rights on February 5, 1965.

BC Lions
Bullocks broke his ankle in the ninth game of the 1965 season after gaining 215 rushing yards (4.8 avg). He was waived on July 27, 1966.

Montreal Alouettes
After being announced that the Montreal Alouettes signed Bullocks on August 5, 1966, the team decided 5 days later not to follow through with the contract.

Pittsburgh Steelers
While being out of football, Bullocks wrote a letter to head coach Bill Austin asking for a trial and subsequently was signed to the team's taxi squad. He was later promoted to the regular roster and in the last game of the 1966 season against the Atlanta Falcons, posting 83 rushing yards on 29 carries and one touchdown. He was placed on the injured reserve list with a back injury on August 29, 1967.

References

External links
Southern Illinois Hall of Fame bio

1939 births
Living people
Players of Canadian football from Chicago
Players of American football from Chicago
American football running backs
Canadian football running backs
American players of Canadian football
Southern Illinois Salukis football players
Dallas Cowboys players
Pittsburgh Steelers players
BC Lions players